Pointe-Lebel is a village municipality in the Côte-Nord region of Quebec, Canada. Its territory makes up the western half of the Manicouagan Peninsula between the mouths of the Outardes and Manicouagan Rivers.

Demographics 

Population trend:
 Population in 2011: 1973 (2006 to 2011 population change: 0.8%)
 Population in 2006: 1958
 Population in 2001: 1931
 Population in 1996: 2011
 Population in 1991: 1818

Mother tongue:
 English as first language: 0.5%
 French as first language: 98.0%
 English and French as first language: 0%
 Other as first language: 1.5%

References

 

Incorporated places in Côte-Nord
Villages in Quebec